The Rebel Gladiators (/ Ursus, the Rebel Gladiator) is a 1962 Italian peplum film directed by Domenico Paolella starring Dan Vadis, Josè Greci and Alan Steel.

Plot
The newly crowned emperor Commodus kidnaps the beautiful Arminia, who happens to be betrothed to the mighty gladiator Ursus. Obsessed with a desire to physically best all other men, he uses the girl as a hostage to force Ursus to fight him in the arena, but when Ursus beats him up and actually forces the dictator to beg for his life, he accuses Ursus of being in league with a group of usurpers who oppose Commodus' tyrannical rule. Ursus finally leads a slave revolt that overthrows Commodus, who is killed in the uprising, and Ursus is reunited with Arminia.

Cast
Dan Vadis as Ursus
Josè Greci as Arminia 
Alan Steel as Commodo/Commodus
Tullio Altamura as Antonino
Nando Tamberlani as Marco Aurelio
Gloria Milland
Gianni Santuccio as Emilio Leto
Sal Borghese as gladiator  
Bruno Scipioni
Andrea Aureli as gladiator instructor
Carlo Delmi as Settimio

References

External links

1963 films
Films directed by Domenico Paolella
Films scored by Carlo Savina
Peplum films
1960s adventure films 
Films set in ancient Rome 
Films set in the Roman Empire
Films set in Rome
Films set in the 2nd century
Films about gladiatorial combat
Sword and sandal films
1960s Italian-language films
1960s Italian films